Berwick Kaler (born 31 October 1946) is a British actor most famous for playing the dame in York Theatre Royal's annual pantomime, which he also wrote and directed until 2020. In 2021 he parted ways with York Theatre Royal and took his brand of traditional panto to the York Grand Opera House. He has been awarded the freedom of the city, and in 2002 received an honorary degree from the University of York. Having grown up in "the slums of Sunderland", Kaler left school at 15 to seek success on the London stage. He got taken on at Dreamland in Margate to learn his trade. He has had TV roles in such shows as The New Statesman, Crocodile Shoes, Auf Wiedersehen, Pet and Spender as well as steady theatre work. However, it is his role in the York pantomime that has won him the most acclaim.

Many pantomimes in recent years have relied heavily on celebrity guest stars and risque humour. Kaler's pantos reject this and hark back to a more traditional form of pantomime. Kaler comments: "I want everyone to laugh at the same joke". Kaler's central role in writing, producing and directing has led Dominic Cavendish of The Telegraph to call him the "panto's biggest asset and its biggest liability." Kaler has assembled a cast of actors who regularly return to the panto.

Towards the end of each pantomime at the Theatre Royal in York Berwick Kaler throws Wagon Wheels, as one might a Frisbee, to the audience, as well as handing out a bottle of Newcastle Brown Ale to a father seated in the stalls.

In November 2010 Kaler followed in the footsteps of actress Jean Alexander and TV presenter Harry Gration in switching on the Christmas lights in the village of Burn. In recognition of the village's Victorian market he dressed as Queen Victoria, something he often does in each pantomime. During the event, he was appointed Honorary Dame of Burn.

In 2012, he was featured on the documentary Michael Grade's History of the Pantomime Dame, which also featured clips from the 2011 pantomime The York Family Robinson, a parody of the novel The Swiss Family Robinson by Johann David Wyss. The programme aired in December 2012 on BBC Four.

He officially retired from the York pantomime in February 2019. His 'glitterball' costume from the final performance, was donated to York Castle Museum and went on public display on 1 May 2019. Despite retiring, Kaler was still heavily involved in the 2019 panto 'Sleeping Beauty', as he wrote the script, co-directed (with Matt Aston) and appeared via films that were screened on stage. The panto was poorly received and led to the Theatre Royal seeking a new change of direction for their future pantomimes, citing poor ticket sales as the main reason (something Kaler disputed). This led to an acrimonious split with the Theatre Royal which became known as 'Panto Wars'. 

Berwick left retirement in 2021 to reunite with his cast members for 'Dick Turpin Rides Again' at a new venue, The Grand Opera House, York, after changes to the York Theatre Royal creative team. However, he was forced to pull out of the production after testing positive for Covid-19 and wrote a letter, read out during the final performance, by stand-in dame Alan McHugh.

Selected appearances
Michael Grade's History of the Pantomime Dame (2012) as himself.
A Knight's Tale (2001) as Man in Stocks
The Worst Witch (1998–1999) as Frank Blossom. Left after Series 2.
Jude (1996)
Spender (1991-1993) as Detective Sergeant Dan BoydA Very British Coup as SmithThe Man With Two Heads (1972)The Rats Are Coming, The Werewolves Are Here (1971)Nightbirds (1970)Bloodthirsty Butchers (1970)The Body Beneath (1970)Annie Get Your Gun (1986) as Foster Wilson and Chief Sitting Bull

References

 External links 
Review in The Stage of The Lad Aladdin2004 interview with Kaler in the Independent.
2005 interview with Kaler in  The Daily Telegraph''.
 
York Theatre Royal

1946 births
Living people
Pantomime dames
British mimes
Actors from County Durham
Male actors from Tyne and Wear
People from Sunderland